Włynkówko  (German: Neu Flinkow) is a village in the administrative district of Gmina Słupsk, within Słupsk County, Pomeranian Voivodeship, in northern Poland.

In 2007 the village had a population of 476.

References

Villages in Słupsk County